Uttarakhand is a Himalayan state of India. This mountainous state contains, in its northern section, some of the highest mountain peaks in the world. Many of them are unclimbed; many are unnamed. A large number of peaks in Uttarakhand are still not open for climbing due to security reasons, as this region borders Tibet Autonomous Region of the People's Republic of China.

Highest major summits
Of the highest major summits of Uttarakhand, 2 peaks exceed , 13 other peaks exceed , further 89 peaks exceed  and at least 100 other peaks exceed  in elevation.

See also
 Askot Musk Deer Sanctuary
 Gangotri National Park
 Govind Pashu Vihar National Park and Sanctuary
 Kedarnath Wildlife Sanctuary
 Nanda Devi National Park
 Valley of Flowers National Park

References

 Joydeep Sircar, Himalayan handbook, Calcutta 1979
 The Alpine Club's Himalayan Index
 Harish Kapadia, Across Peaks and Passes in Garhwal Himalaya, Indus Publishing,1999 
 Harish Kapadia, Across Peaks and Passes in Kumaun Himalaya, Indus Publishing,1999 
 Harish Kapadia and Soli Mehta, Exploring the Hidden Himalaya, Hodder and Stoughton, 1990, 
 E. T. Atkinson, The Himalayan Gazetteer
 J. Patel, The Garhwal Kumaon Himalayas, Himalayan Club, Bombay, 1985.
 Mohindar Singh Randhawa, The Kumaon Himalayas, Oxford and IBH, New Delhi, 1970.

 01
.Uttarakhand
Uttarakhand
Mountains